The 2016 North Dakota Democratic presidential caucuses were held on June 7 in the U.S. state of North Dakota as one of the Democratic Party's primaries ahead of the 2016 presidential election.

The Republican Party did not hold a caucus; Republican presidential delegates were chosen at a party convention on April 2–3. However, Democratic Party's primaries in California, Montana, New Jersey, New Mexico and South Dakota were held the same day, as were Republican primaries in the same five states.

Opinion polling

No polls were conducted.

Results

Analysis
As he had in other caucus states and among other largely white, rural electorates in the farm belt, Sanders won a large victory over Hillary Clinton in North Dakota. Sanders won in the cities of Fargo, Bismarck, and Grand Forks where he had campaigned heavily, and he also swept most other rural, conservative counties in the state. The caucus did not require participants to register before voting due to the state's small population.

Analyst for the New York Times Nate Cohn summarized the results: "A Sanders win in North Dakota isn’t much of a surprise. It’s a caucus state and it’s a small state, worth just 18 delegates. He’s won every caucus since Nevada."

References

North Dakota
Democratic primary
2016